Mimagria is a genus of true flies in the family Sarcophagidae.

Species
M. xiangchengensis (Chao & Zhang, 1988)

References 

Sarcophagidae
Schizophora genera